The Jungle Goddess is a 1922 American adventure film serial, directed by James Conway, in 15 chapters, starring Elinor Field, Truman Van Dyke and Marie Pavis. A co-production by William N. Selig Productions and Warner Bros., it was distributed by the Export & Import Film Company, and ran in U.S. theaters between May 15 and August 21, 1922.

This serial is considered lost.

Synopsis

A young girl is kidnapped and put in the basket of a hot air balloon. The balloon is accidentally cut loose and drifts into the middle of the African jungle. The young girl is captured by a tribe of cannibals, who transform her into the tribe's goddess. Years later, a young man who had been her childhood friend organizes a jungle expedition to find and save her.

Cast
 Elinor Field as Betty Castleton / "Jungle Goddess"
 Truman Van Dyke as Ralph Dean
 Marie Pavis as Betty's Mother
 L. M. Wells as Dr. James Scranton
 Lafe McKee as Chief Obar Sen
 Vonda Phelps as Betty as a Little Girl
 Olin Francis as High Priest
 William Pratt as Constable
 George Reed as Native guide

Chapter titles
 Sacrificed to the Lions
 The City of Blind Waters
 Saved by the Great Ape
 The Hell-Ship
 Wild Beasts in Command
 Sky High with a Leopard
 The Rajah's Revenge
 The Alligator's Victim
 At Grips with Death
 The Leopard Woman
 Soul of Buddha
 Jaws of Death
 Cave of Beasts
 Jungle Terrors
 The Mad Lion

Release
The film was given an international release, being released in Brazil under the title A Deusa do Sertão ("The Goddess of the Sertão").

References

External links

1922 films
1922 lost films
1922 adventure films
American silent serial films
American black-and-white films
Lost American films
1920s American films
Silent adventure films